Leonor Urueta (born 22 March 1954) is a Mexican former breaststroke swimmer. She competed in two events at the 1972 Summer Olympics. She finished third in the 1971 Pan American Games 200 metres breaststroke and third in the 1971 Pan American Games 4×100 metres medley.

References

External links
 

1954 births
Living people
Mexican female breaststroke swimmers
Olympic swimmers of Mexico
Swimmers at the 1972 Summer Olympics
Swimmers at the 1971 Pan American Games
Pan American Games bronze medalists for Mexico
Pan American Games medalists in swimming
Place of birth missing (living people)
Medalists at the 1971 Pan American Games